Saylyk is a village in the Chüy District of Chüy Region of Kyrgyzstan. Its population was 1,384 in 2021. The village was established in 1929.

References

Populated places in Chüy Region